The Bronze Cross of Rhodesia was a Rhodesian military decoration for gallantry.

Institution
The award was instituted in 1970 by Presidential Warrant, the first awards being made the same year. The last awards were made in June 1980.

Medal
The medal was a bronze cross with an enamelled roundel in the centre bearing a lion's head, suspended from a ribbon. The ribbons of the Bronze Cross differed in colour according to the service in which the recipient was enlisted; thus Army awards had a red ribbon with three white stripes; Air Force awards a purple ribbon with stripes and Guard Force awards a brown ribbon with stripes.  The Army ribbon has a strong and no doubt accidental resemblance to the Canadian Forces Decoration for long service.  The medal was impressed in small capitals with the recipient's name on the reverse, and was awarded with a case of issue, miniature medal for wear, and an illuminated certificate.

Recipients
A total of 131 awards of the Bronze Cross of Rhodesia were made, seven posthumously. Notable recipients included the author Alan Thrush, SAS officer Grahame Wilson and air force officer Norman Walsh. Recipients are entitled to the post-nominal letters B.C.R.

Zimbabwe
The Bronze Cross of Rhodesia was superseded in October 1980  by the Bronze Cross of Zimbabwe, which is awarded for conspicuous bravery, and which is open for award to civilians as well as military personnel.

Notes

References
Saffery, D., 2006. The Rhodesia Medal Roll, Jeppestown Press, United Kingdom. 
Rhodesian Militaria: Bronze Cross of Rhodesia – Detailed photos & descriptions of genuine Bronze Crosses of Rhodesia and the breakdown of B.C.R.'s awarded to various units.

External links
Orders, Medals and Decorations of Zimbabwe

Military awards and decorations of Rhodesia
1970 establishments in Rhodesia
1980 disestablishments in Zimbabwe
Awards established in 1970